Evgeny Rybnitsky (born July 8, 1989) is a Russian ice hockey defenceman. He is currently playing with ORG Beijing of the Supreme Hockey League (VHL). He was a first round selection in the 2009 KHL Junior Draft.

Rybnitsky made his Kontinental Hockey League (KHL) debut playing with HC Neftekhimik Nizhnekamsk during the 2011–12 KHL season.

References

External links

1989 births
Living people
Amur Khabarovsk players
Avtomobilist Yekaterinburg players
HC Neftekhimik Nizhnekamsk players
KRS Heilongjiang players
Russian ice hockey defencemen
Sportspeople from Chelyabinsk